Brian Harvey (born 24 February 1949) is a former Australian rules football player. Harvey played two Victorian Football League (VFL) matches for Footscray.

References

1949 births
Living people
Australian rules footballers from Victoria (Australia)
Western Bulldogs players
West Footscray Football Club players